FK Zomin is an Uzbekistani football club based in Zomin, Jizzakh Region, Uzbekistan. They play in the second level in Uzbekistani football.

History
The club was founded in 1996. From 2005 to 2011 and participated in the Uzbekistan Second League. Since 2012 season they has been playing in the First division of the Uzbekistan Pro League.

Extarnal Links
footballfacts.ru
teams.by
Soccerway profile

1996 establishments in Uzbekistan
Football clubs in Uzbekistan
Jizzakh Region